Isobel Grant or Iseabail Dhubh Thulach fl. 1637 was a historical figure in Scotland who was involved in an infamous case of murder.

Biography 
Isobel was the daughter of Grant of Tulloch (aka Fear Thulach, aka McJokkie). The Grants and the MacGregors were brought into dispute when Isobel had supposedly given her affections to a MacGregor named Iain Dubh Gearr.

A fight ensued near her family homestead when a rival suitor tried to claim her hand.

The MacGregors, and other men, are alleged to have attacked John Steuart, near Tulloch, Strathspey and the report states they:

Legacy 
This murderous event is believed to have inspired the composition of the Reel of Tulloch, a specific dance for males  derived from a rough game of football that Tulloch men played with the severed head of an enemy.

References

External links 

 The Reel of Tulloch on the Traditional Tune Archive

17th-century Scottish women